Below are the rosters for the 2013 CONCACAF U-20 Championship held in Mexico from February 18 – March 2, 2013.

Group A

United States
Coach:  Tab Ramos

Costa Rica
Coach:  Jafet Soto

Haiti

Coach:  Manuel Navarro Rodriguez

Group B

Canada
Coach:  Nick Dasovic

Cuba
Coach:  Raúl González Triana

Nicaragua
Coach:  Enrique Llena León

Group C

Jamaica
Coach:  Luciano Gama

Puerto Rico

Coach:  Jeaustin Campos Madriz

Panama

Coach:  Javier Wanchope Watson

Group D

Curaçao

Coach:  Hendrik Jan Schrijver

Mexico

Coach:  Sergio Almaguer

El Salvador
Coach:  Mauricio Alfaro

References

CONCACAF Under-20 Championship squads